Polina Kaplina (born 16 August 1999) is a Russian handballer who plays for CSKA Moscow.

Awards and recognition 
 All-Star Goalkeeper of the Junior World Championship: 2018

References
  

1999 births
Living people
Sportspeople from Irkutsk
Russian female handball players